is a former Japanese football player. She played for Japan national team.

Club career
Mizuma was born in Yamagata Prefecture on July 22, 1970. She played for Urawa Motobuto Ladies FC until 1992. In 1993, she moved to Asahi Kokusai Bunnys (later Takarazuka Bunnys). In 1995, she retired for injury.

National team career
On September 9, 1990, when Mizuma was 20 years old, she debuted and scored a goal for Japan national team against South Korea. She was a member of Japan for 1991 World Cup. She also played at 1990 Asian Games, 1991 and 1993 AFC Championship. She played 22 games and scored 10 goals for Japan until 1994.

National team statistics

References

External links
 

1970 births
Living people
Association football people from Yamagata Prefecture
Japanese women's footballers
Japan women's international footballers
Nadeshiko League players
Urawa Motobuto Ladies FC players
Bunnys Kyoto SC players
Footballers at the 1990 Asian Games
1991 FIFA Women's World Cup players
Women's association football forwards
Asian Games silver medalists for Japan
Asian Games medalists in football
Medalists at the 1990 Asian Games